Epipagis triserialis is a moth in the family Crambidae. It is found in Tanzania.

References

Moths described in 1907
Spilomelinae